Ibn Sbyel or Ibn Sbe'yel or AlSbyel (Arabic ابن سبيل) are a family from the Al-Qmesah clan, from the Adnanite tribe of `Anizzah.  The family is notable for their connection to the Ma’anagi Arabian horse studs :

 Ma’anagi Sbyeli stud .

Ma'anagi Sbyeli Stud
The Ma'anagi Sbyeli stud is one of the oldest Arabian horse studs.

References 

Semitic-speaking peoples
Rabi`ah
Tribes of Arabia
Bedouin groups
People in horse racing